Strauss Is Playing Today is a 1928 German silent drama film directed by Conrad Wiene and starring Alfred Abel, Hermine Sterler and Imre Ráday. The film was made at the Tempelhof Studios in Berlin. It portrays the relationship between the father and son Austrian composers Johann Strauss I and Johann Strauss II.

Cast
Alfred Abel as Johann Strauss father
Hermine Sterler as Anna, his wife
Imre Ráday as Johann Strauss son
Antonie Jaeckel as Deisinger's wife
Willy Schmieder as Deisinger
Lilian Ellis as Liesl
Ferdinand Bonn as Drechsler
Trude Hesterberg as Trampusch
Jakob Tiedtke as Wieß
Paul Hörbiger as Lamperlhirsch
Eugen Neufeld as Grand Duke
John Mylong as Mödlinger

See also
A Waltz by Strauss (1931)

References

External links

Films of the Weimar Republic
German silent feature films
German historical drama films
1920s historical drama films
Biographical films about musicians
Films about classical music and musicians
Films about composers
Films directed by Conrad Wiene
Films set in Vienna
Films set in the 19th century
Films shot in Berlin
Films shot at Tempelhof Studios
German black-and-white films
Cultural depictions of Johann Strauss I
Cultural depictions of Johann Strauss II
1928 drama films
Silent drama films
1920s German films
1920s German-language films